The Buick Envista is a compact crossover SUV produced by General Motors under the Buick brand since 2022. It was unveiled for the Chinese market in August 2022. In November 2022, GM announced that the Envista will also be sold in the United States.

Overview 

The Buick Envista rides on GM's VSS-F platform and is equipped with a turbocharged 1.5-liter inline-four engine that produces 181 horsepower and 183 pound-feet of torque. The gearbox is a continuously variable automatic transmission.

The interior of the Envista has a dashboard featuring two 10.3-inch screens, one for the digital gauge cluster and one as the central infotainment touchscreen. Wireless Apple CarPlay is offered, as well as over-the-air updates and surround-sound audio system.

References

External links 
 
 Official press release

Envista
Cars introduced in 2022
Compact sport utility vehicles
Crossover sport utility vehicles
Front-wheel-drive vehicles
Vehicles with CVT transmission
Cars of China